Belenois diminuta is a butterfly in the family Pieridae. It is found in the Democratic Republic of the Congo, Tanzania and northern and central Zambia. The habitat consists of Brachystegia woodland.

References

External links
Seitz, A. Die Gross-Schmetterlinge der Erde 13: Die Afrikanischen Tagfalter. Plate XIII 13

Butterflies described in 1894
Pierini
Butterflies of Africa